The 2021 Open de Tenis Ciudad de Pozoblanco was a professional tennis tournament played on hard courts. It was the 15th edition of the tournament which was part of the 2021 ATP Challenger Tour. It took place in Pozoblanco, Spain between 19 and 25 July 2021.

Singles main-draw entrants

Seeds

 1 Rankings are as of July 12, 2021.

Other entrants
The following players received wildcards into the singles main draw:
  Nicolás Álvarez Varona
  Alberto Barroso Campos
  Blas Ruiz Romero

The following players received entry into the singles main draw as alternates:
  Carlos Gómez-Herrera
  Skander Mansouri
  Rayane Roumane

The following players received entry from the qualifying draw:
  Mathias Bourgue
  Michael Geerts
  Matteo Martineau
  Emilio Nava

The following player received entry as a lucky loser:
  Federico Zeballos

Champions

Singles

 Altuğ Çelikbilek def.  Cem İlkel 6–1, 6–7(2–7), 6–3.

Doubles

 Igor Sijsling /  Tim van Rijthoven def.  Diego Hidalgo /  Sergio Martos Gornés 5–7, 7–6(7–4), [10–5].

References

2021 ATP Challenger Tour
2021
2021 in Spanish tennis
July 2021 sports events in Spain